Jennifer Kes Remington is an American composer and filmmaker. She has done music for titles such as The Powerpuff Girls, Scary Movie 4, Foster's Home for Imaginary Friends, Socket, and Clerks II. Her work on Foster's Home for Imaginary Friends garnered her two Annie Award wins in 2005 and 2006 as well as a third Annie nomination in 2007. All three were in the category "Best Music in an Animated Television Production" and shared with series composer James L. Venable. Her documentary film Hollywood, 90038 won the award for Best Documentary at the 2007 LA Femme Film Festival. She has also composed music for the video games Raving Rabbids: Travel in Time, Raving Rabbids: Alive & Kicking, and Rabbids Land.

Personal life
Remington attended Pittsford Mendon High School and later Eastman School of Music in Rochester, New York. She obtained her Bachelor of Fine Arts degree in music technology at the University of Michigan School of Music, Theatre & Dance in Ann Arbor, Michigan, in 2000.

Filmography

Accolades

References

External links
 
 
 

Living people
Place of birth missing (living people)
Year of birth missing (living people)
American television composers
American filmmakers
University of Michigan School of Music, Theatre & Dance alumni
Annie Award winners
Eastman School of Music alumni